The Banggai Regency is a regency located at the eastern end of Central Sulawesi Province of Indonesia. It makes up a re-established regency (kabupaten), created in 1999 by splitting the existing Banggai Regency into this smaller Banggai Regency situated on the mainland of Sulawesi (capital, Luwuk) and a new Banggai Islands Regency comprising the offshore islands (capital, Banggai town) which are separated from mainland Sulawesi by the Peleng Straits (Selat Peleng). The residual Banggai Regency covers an area of 9,672.70 km2 and had a population of 323,626 at the 2010 census and 362,275 at the 2020 census; the official estimate as at mid 2021 was 366,224.

Administration 
At the time of the 2010 census, the Banggai regency was divided into eighteen districts (kecamatan). Subsequently, another five districts have been created by the division of four existing districts in 2012 and 2015. The twenty-three districts are tabulated below with their areas and their 2010 and 2020 census populations, together with the official estimates as at mid 2021. The table also includes the locations of the district administrative centres, the number of villages in each district (291 rural desa and 46 urban kelurahan in total), and its post code.

Notes: (a) The 2010 populations of Luwuk Utara and Luwuk Selatan districts are included in the figure for Luwuk district, from which they were split away in 2015 and 2012 respectively.(b) The 2010 population of Nambo district is included in the figure for Kintom district, from which it was split away in 2012.(c) The 2010 population of Mantoh district is included in the figure for Lamala district, from which it was split away in 2012.(d) The 2010 population of Balantak Utara district is included in the figure for Balantak district, from which it was split away in 2012.

References

External links